Zilberman is a surname. Notable people with the surname include:

 David Zilberman (economist) (born 1947), Israeli-American economist and professor
 David Zilberman (wrestler) (born 1982), Canadian Olympic freestyle wrestler
 David B. Zilberman (1938–1977), Russian-American philosopher and sociologist
 Hary Isac Zilberman (a.k.a. Haralamb Zincă 1923–2008), Romanian writer
 Menachem Zilberman (1946–2014), Israeli actor, comedian and songwriter
 Misha Zilberman (born 1989), Israeli Olympic badminton player
 Polina Zilberman (born 1969), German and Moldovan chess master
 Victor Zilberman, Romanian boxer
 Yaacov Zilberman (born 1954), Israeli chess master
 Yitzhak Shlomo Zilberman (1929-2001), Israeli rabbi, pioneer of the Zilberman Method in Jewish education

See also
 Zilberman Method, teaching emphasizes rote learning of the text of the Torah from an early age
 Silberman
 Silverman
 Zylberman

Jewish surnames
Yiddish-language surnames